Lost My Baby or I Lost My Baby may refer to:

 "Lost My Baby Blues", a song by David Frizzell
 "Since I Lost My Baby", a song by The Temptations